Flora is a surname. It may refer to :

Alessandra Flora (born 1975), Italian lyricist and composer
Dom Flora, American college basketball player
Don Flora, American volleyball coach
Ioana Flora (born 1975), Romanian actress
Jerry Flora, American college football coach
Jim Flora, American illustrator
Snowden D. Flora, American meteorologist, climatologist and tornado researcher
Vaughn Flora (1945-2022), American politician